Sarur may refer to:

Şərur, Azerbaijan
Sarur, Iran
Sarur, Karnataka, India